Mahatma Gandhi Marg is the main pedestrian road located in the downtown Gangtok, Sikkim.

History 
In 2008, the North Eastern Council under the Ministry of Development of North Eastern Region undertook the project of “Upgradation and Remodelling of existing distribution system of Mahatma Gandhi Road and its surrounding areas, Gangtok.”

As of 2015, Mahatma Gandhi Marg is the only road in Gangtok which has divided carriageway.

In popular culture 

 "MG Rodaima", a song about the road, from the 2019 film Hajar Juni Samma

Gallery

Landmarks

See also 
 Leh Market

References 

Roads in Sikkim
Shopping_districts_and_streets_in_India
Bazaars_in_India